The Princeton Historic District is a  historic district located in Princeton, New Jersey that was listed on the U.S. National Register of Historic Places in 1975.  It stretches from Marquand Park in the west to the Eating Clubs in the East, from the Princeton Cemetery in the north to the Graduate College in the south.  The district encompasses the core parts of the campuses of the Princeton Theological Seminary and Princeton University.  It also includes the business district centered on Nassau Street and many historic homes, both mansions in the western section and more humble dwellings in the Witherspoon/Jackson neighborhood.  Notable churches within the district include Nassau Presbyterian Church, Trinity Episcopal, Nassau Christian Center, and the Princeton University Chapel.  The district is home to seven of Princeton's nine, and New Jersey's fifty-eight, National Historic Landmarks, the largest concentration of such sites in the state.

Significance

Princeton, and the world-renowned University to which it is home, has played a significant role in 300 years of American history.  Not only does the town have a strong architectural heritage, it has also made notable contributions to the world of politics, religion, science, and literature.

Princeton's first settlers came in the 1690s, with Quakers settling along the Stony Brook, and the Kingston Mill being built along the Millstone River.  The town itself grew up in the early 18th century along an old Indian trail which became Nassau Street.  The College of New Jersey, which became Princeton University in 1896, was founded in 1746 and moved to Princeton ten years later on the completion of Nassau Hall.  The town sent two residents to sign the Declaration of Independence, Richard Stockton and John Witherspoon.  A third former resident, Joseph Hewes, whose house, Maybury Hill, is a national historic landmark in Princeton that lies outside the historic district, also was a signer.  The town was occupied by the British during the American Revolution, using Bainbridge House as their headquarters.  After his famous crossing of the Delaware and victory at the Battle of Trenton, George Washington led the Continental Army to victory at the Battle of Princeton on January 3, 1777.  Nassau Hall itself served as the capital of the United States in the summer of 1783 and George Washington received the nation's thanks there.

Princeton was home to four presidents, James Madison and Woodrow Wilson as students, the later also as university president, Grover Cleveland in the years after he left the White House, and John F. Kennedy during his freshman year, before his transfer to Harvard. Aaron Burr, Jr. was a student here before being Vice-President of the United States and is buried in the Princeton Cemetery at the feet of his more highly esteemed father, Aaron Burr, Sr., and theologian grandfather, Jonathan Edwards. Many architects from Benjamin Latrobe and Ralph Adams Cram to I.M. Pei and Frank Gehry have left their mark on the town.  As home to the oldest Presbyterian Theological Seminary, Princeton has been host to many important theologians from Archibald Alexander and Samuel Miller to Charles Hodge and B.B. Warfield. Joseph Henry brought Princeton first to prominence as a center of science, a legacy that led Albert Einstein to make Princeton's Institute for Advanced Study his home after he fled Germany in 1933.  Princeton has also been home to writers as varied as Thomas Mann, Upton Sinclair, F. Scott Fitzgerald, and Toni Morrison.

Contributing properties

National Historic Landmarks

|}

Independently listed on the National Register of Historic Places

|}

Other significant contributing properties

|}

See also

National Register of Historic Places listings in Mercer County, New Jersey
List of National Historic Landmarks in New Jersey

References

Colonial architecture in the United States
Georgian architecture in New Jersey
Victorian architecture in New Jersey
Historic districts in Princeton, New Jersey
National Register of Historic Places in Mercer County, New Jersey
Princeton University
Princeton Theological Seminary

Historic districts on the National Register of Historic Places in New Jersey
New Jersey Register of Historic Places